(Thomas?) Damett (?1389–1390 — between 15 July 1436 and 14 April 1437) was an English composer during the stylistic transitional from medieval to Renaissance music.

Identity and career
The illegitimate son of a gentleman, he was a commoner at Winchester College until 1406–7 and became rector of Stockton, Wiltshire, in 1413. His name appears occasionally in the Royal Household Chapel accounts between 1413 and 1430–31. He was also prebendary of Rugmere in St Paul's Cathedral 1418–1436, was appointed to the fifth stall in St George's Chapel, Windsor Castle in 1431 and held the canonry until 1436.

Music
Nine works by him survive in the Old Hall Manuscript and may be autographs: six mass movements (including a Gloria-Credo pair based on a Square) and three motets (one isorhythmic).

Works

Editions

References

Citations

Sources

External links
 
 Works by Damett in the Medieval Music Database from La Trobe University

English composers
Canons of Windsor
1436 deaths
Year of birth unknown